Esther Eroles Baena is a Spanish Paralympic swimmer. She won four silver medals at the 1988 Summer Paralympics in Seoul.

Career 
At the 1988 Summer Paralympics in Seoul, she won silver medals in 100 meters breaststroke 5, 100 meters backstroke 5, 100 meters freestyle 5, and  400 meters freestyle 5.

At the 1994 IPC Swimming World Championships, in Malta, she won a gold medal in Women's 4x100 meters Medley S7-10, and bronze medal in Women's 100 meters Butterfly S9.

She worked with  Fundación Johan Cruyff.

References 

Living people
Paralympic swimmers of Spain
Spanish female freestyle swimmers
Spanish female backstroke swimmers
Spanish female breaststroke swimmers
Swimmers at the 1988 Summer Paralympics
Medalists at the 1988 Summer Paralympics
Paralympic silver medalists for Spain
Medalists at the World Para Swimming Championships
Year of birth missing (living people)